The NOFV-Oberliga Mitte was the third tier of the German football league system in the central states of former East Germany and West Berlin. The league existed from 1991 to 1994. It covered the German states of Berlin, Brandenburg and Saxony-Anhalt.

Overview 
The NOFV-Oberliga Mitte was formed in 1991 when, along with the political reunion of Germany, the former East German football league system was integrated into the unified German system.

The abbreviation NOFV stands for Nordostdeutscher Fußballverband, meaning North East German Football Association.

Along with this league, two other NOFV-Oberligas were formed, the NOFV-Oberliga Nord and the NOFV-Oberliga Süd. Unlike the other two leagues who had 18 clubs, the Mitte-division started out with 20 clubs.

The league was formed from clubs from six different leagues: Two clubs from the Oberliga Nordost, the former DDR-Oberliga, six clubs from the NOFV-Liga A and B, the former East German second division, one club from the Bezirksliga East-Berlin, one of the regional leagues of the old East German third league level, one from the Verbandsliga Brandenburg, a new league, ten clubs from the Amateur-Oberliga Berlin, the West German third division for the city of Berlin, and two from the Landesliga Berlin, the old fourth division. The league accommodated therefore a wide mix of clubs from the east and west of Germany. It was also the first time since 1950 that clubs from East and West Berlin played in the same league.

The league became one of the then ten Oberligas in the united Germany, the third tier of league football. Its champion was however not directly promoted to the 2nd Bundesliga but had to take part in a promotion play-off. The 1. FC Union Berlin, the only team ever to win the league, failed in all three attempts to win promotion.

For the duration of the league the leagues below it were:

 Verbandsliga Berlin
 Verbandsliga Brandenburg
 Verbandsliga Sachsen-Anhalt

In the 1992–93 season, Hertha BSC II, playing in the NOFV-Oberliga Mitte, became the first third division club and the only Oberliga club so far to reach the DFB-Pokal final, losing to Bayer 04 Leverkusen 1–0.

In 1994, the German football league system saw some major changes. The four Regionalligas were introduced as an intermediate level between 2nd Bundesliga and Oberligas, relegating the Oberligas to fourth tier from now on. In the east of Germany, the Regionalliga Nordost was formed, a league covering the area of former East Germany and West-Berlin. Six clubs from the NOFV-Oberliga Mitte were admitted to the new league:

 1. FC Union Berlin 
 FC Energie Cottbus 
 Türkiyemspor Berlin 
 Lok Altmark Stendal 
 Hertha BSC II
 Hertha Zehlendorf

The NOFV-Oberliga Mitte however was disbanded and its clubs, apart from the ones that went to the Regionalliga, were spread between the two remaining Oberligas in the east. Five of its clubs went to the NOFV-Oberliga Nord, four to the Süd-division. The last placed team, Frohnauer SC, was relegated to the Verbandsliga Berlin.

League champions
The league champions:

Placings and all-time table of the league
The complete list of clubs in the league and their final placings:

 Two points for a win.

Key

Founding members of the league
The founding members of the league in 1991 were:

From the Oberliga Nordost:
 1. FC Magdeburg
 FC Energie Cottbus

From the NOFV-Liga Staffel A:
 1. FC Union Berlin 
 1. FC Lok Stendal
 FSV Glückauf Brieske-Senftenberg
 Rotation Berlin, became BSV Spindlersfeld, joined BSC Marzahn in 1995

From the NOFV-Liga Staffel B:
 Stahl Thale, became SV Thale 04, then Stahl Thale again
 Anhalt Dessau, now Vorwärts Dessau again

From the Verbandsliga Brandenburg:
 FSV Velten, now defunct

From the Bezirksliga Berlin (East):
 EAB Lichtenberg 47, now SV Lichtenberg 47

From the Amateur-Oberliga Berlin:
 Hertha BSC II
 Türkiyemspor Berlin 
 VfB Lichterfelde, became Lichterfelder FC, now defunct
 Hertha Zehlendorf
 Marathon 02 Berlin, now defunct
 SCC Berlin
 Blau-Weiß 90 Berlin II, now defunct
 SC Gatow
From the Landesliga Berlin:
 Türkspor Berlin
 FV Wannsee

References

Sources
 Deutschlands Fußball in Zahlen,  An annual publication with tables and results from the Bundesliga to Verbandsliga/Landesliga. DSFS.
 Kicker Almanach,  The yearbook on German football from Bundesliga to Oberliga, since 1937. Kicker Sports Magazine.
 Die Deutsche Liga-Chronik 1945-2005  History of German football from 1945 to 2005 in tables. DSFS. 2006.

External links 
 Das deutsche Fussball Archiv  Historic German league tables 
 Nordostdeutscher Fußballverband (NOFV)

Mitte
Defunct Oberligas (football)
Football competitions in Berlin
Football competitions in Brandenburg
Football competitions in Saxony-Anhalt
1991 establishments in Germany
1994 disestablishments in Germany
Sports leagues established in 1991
Ger